Colares may refer to:
 Colares, Pará, a municipality in the State of Pará, Brazil
 Colares (Sintra), a civil parish in the municipality of Sintra, Portugal